Space Junk, or space debris, is defunct artificial objects in space, principally in Earth orbit.

Space Junk may also refer to:

Songs
 "Space Junk", by Devo from Q. Are We Not Men? A: We Are Devo!, 1978
 "Space Junk", by Helix from Rockin' in My Outer Space, 2004
 "Space Junk", by Wolfgang Gartner from Weekend in America, 2011
 "Space Junk (Wang Chung '97)", by Wang Chung from Everybody Wang Chung Tonight: Wang Chung's Greatest Hits, 1997

Other uses
 Space Junk, a 2010 artwork by Marisa Olson
 Space Junk, a 2011 novel by Rory Barnes
 Space Junk, an unfinished video game by Imagitec Design for the Atari Falcon